Benjamin Sulimani (born 26 September 1988) is an Austrian footballer who plays for SC Korneuburg.

His brother Emin is also a professional footballer.

Career
In July 2013, Sulimani signed a six-month contract with Tippeligaen side Viking FK, before resigned for Admira Wacker in December 2013.

References

External links
Benjamin Sulimani at ÖFB

1988 births
Living people
Austrian footballers
Austrian expatriate footballers
Austrian Football Bundesliga players
2. Liga (Austria) players
Eliteserien players
SV Ried players
SpVgg Greuther Fürth players
SC Austria Lustenau players
FC Admira Wacker Mödling players
FK Austria Wien players
Kapfenberger SV players
SC-ESV Parndorf 1919 players
Viking FK players
SV Grödig players
SV Horn players
Austrian expatriate sportspeople in Germany
Austrian expatriate sportspeople in Norway
Expatriate footballers in Germany
Expatriate footballers in Norway
Austrian people of Macedonian descent
Austrian people of Albanian descent
Association football forwards
People from Wels
Footballers from Upper Austria